Ashley Lobo is an Indian-Australian choreographer and  is considered  to be a spearhead of International dance in India. He was also one of the three judges for the Indian reality dance talent show India's Dancing Superstar on Star Plus.
He is the Founder and Artistic Director of both The Danceworx Performing Arts Academy and Navdhara India Dance Theatre.

Career

In 2017, Lobo was invited to create a full-length contemporary dance production Das Dschungelbuch for the Ballet Chemnitz in Germany. In 2018, he worked with Zawirowania Dance Theater in Poland on a contemporary dance collaboration titled The Crossing. In 2019, Lobo is once again choreographing a full-length contemporary dance production Yama for Landestheater Linz in Austria.

The Danceworx Performing Arts Academy  set up in 1998 has pioneered access to formal western dance training for youth in New Delhi, Mumbai and other Indian cities . The dance school is set up with a vision  providing access to international dance styles in structured and  casual formats .

Television

Film choreography

References

 https://www.news18.com/news/movies/not-many-people-know-i-have-choreographed-for-30-bollywood-films-ashley-lobo-3693665.html

 Ashley Lobo at The Danceworx
 Ashley Lobo at Navdhara India Dance Theatre

Indian film choreographers
Indian male dancers
Indian contemporary dancers
Indian choreographers
Contemporary dance choreographers
Living people
1967 births
Dancers from Maharashtra
Artists from Mumbai